This is a list of Members of Parliament (MPs) elected in the 1987 general election, held on 11 June. The Parliament lasted until 1992, although the Prime Minister, Margaret Thatcher, was replaced on 28 November 1990 by Chancellor of the Exchequer, John Major.

Diane Abbott was one of the first three Black British MPs in the House of Commons; Bernie Grant and Paul Boateng were elected alongside her at the same election.

During the 1987–92 Parliament, Bernard Weatherill was the Speaker, Margaret Thatcher and John Major served as Prime Minister, and Neil Kinnock served as Leader of the Opposition. This Parliament was dissolved on 16 March 1992.

Composition
These representative diagrams show the composition of the parties in the 1987 general election.

Note: The Scottish National Party and Plaid Cymru sit together as a party group, while Sinn Féin has not taken its seats. This is not the official seating plan of the House of Commons, which has five rows of benches on each side, with the government party to the right of the Speaker and opposition parties to the left, but with room for only around two-thirds of MPs to sit at any one time.



By-elections
See the List of United Kingdom by-elections (1979–2010).

1987
1987 United Kingdom general election
Lists of UK MPs 1987–1992
 Main
UK MPs